La finta parigina (The false Parisienne) is an opera buffa in 3 acts by Domenico Cimarosa with an Italian  libretto by Francesco Cerlone. The opera premiered at the Teatro Nuovo in Naples, in 1773.

The opera
La finta parigina was composed for Carnival of 1773 and, although the exact date of the work's premiere is now unknown. It is the second of the sixty-eight operas that Cimarosa wrote and is written in the then popular style of Neapolitan opera buffa. The libretto uses Neapolitan dialect and praises Cimarosa's home town of Aversa, notably its mozzarella cheese and Asprina wine. most of the opera consists of solo numbers, with only a few brief duets and ensembles.

The opera relates the amorous misadventures of a group including the shopkeeper Cardillo (baritone), his sister Rosalina (soprano), the nobles Donna Olimpia (soprano) and Don Flaminio (alto), a Frenchman Monsiu Blò (tenor) and Donna Armida (soprano), the 'fake Parisienne'.

Roles

Recordings
 La finta parigina with conductor Danilo Lombardini and the Orchestra Filarmonica Siciliana. Cast includes: Alessia Sparacio (Armida), Juan Gambina (Flaminio), Nunzio Galli (Le Blò), Alessandro Battiato (Martino), Anna Rita Gemmabella (Olimpia), Rosita Ramini (Preziosa), Alice Sunseri (Rosolina), Paolo Cutolo (Cardillo), and Giovanni Bellavia (Malacarne). Released on the Bongiovanni label in 1999.

References 
Sources
 Rossi, Nick and Talmage Fauntleroy (1999). Domenico Cimarosa - His Life and Operas. Westport, CT: Greenwood Press. 

Notes

1773 operas
Italian-language operas
Opera buffa
Operas
Operas by Domenico Cimarosa